Ecaterina Stahl-Iencic (31 July 1946 – 26 November 2009) was a Romanian foil fencer, world champion in 1975. She competed at five Olympics from 1964 to 1980, winning team bronze medals in 1968 and 1972.

Biography
She was born Katalin Jencsik. (Hungarian name order Jencsik Katalin) She belonged to the Hungarian minority in Transylvania.  she took up fencing when she was 14 at local club Unio Satu Mare under the coaching of Alexandru Csipler. There she became friends with Ileana Gyulai, with whom she would fence in the Romanian national team, and with József Szepessy, who would become team world champion with Germany in 1973.

In 1964, at 18 years, Stahl won the Romanian national championship with Unio, and transferred to CSA Steaua in Bucharest. The same year, she took part in her first Olympics in the team foil event. Romania was defeated by the Soviet Union in quarter-finals and finished 5th after prevailing over France. In 1965 she won the Junior World Championships in Rotterdam. She also earned a team silver medal with Romania at the senior 1965 World Fencing Championships. She earned her first major individual medal, a bronze, at the 1966 World Fencing Championships. She would earn two individual medals, including gold in 1975, and seven team medals at the World Championships throughout her career. 

In 1967 Stahl married István  Stahl, a sports journalist at Hungarian-language magazine Friss Újság. The couple had two daughters, Gabriela and Cristina, who became a foil fencer too. In 1968 Stahl took part in her second Olympics. This time, she earned a team bronze medal, along with Ana Pascu, Ileana Drîmba, Olga Szabo and Maria Vicol. She took another bronze medal at the 1972 Summer Olympics with the same teammates, Maria Vicol being replaced by Ileana Gyulai.

After her retirement in 1984 Stahl became a fencing coach at CS Satu Mare, in her home town. She trained amongst others Olympic silver medallist Rita König and her own daughter, Olympian Cristina. She was named in 2006 honorary citizen of Satu Mare. She died on 26 November 2009 of colon cancer. Her name was given in 2015 to the Satu Mare Cup, a competition of the European women's foil circuit for cadets.

References

1946 births
2009 deaths
Romanian female fencers
Fencers at the 1964 Summer Olympics
Fencers at the 1968 Summer Olympics
Fencers at the 1972 Summer Olympics
Fencers at the 1976 Summer Olympics
Fencers at the 1980 Summer Olympics
Olympic fencers of Romania
Olympic bronze medalists for Romania
Olympic medalists in fencing
Medalists at the 1968 Summer Olympics
Medalists at the 1972 Summer Olympics
Romanian people of German descent
Sportspeople from Satu Mare
Universiade medalists in fencing
Universiade silver medalists for Romania